Sociorobotics is a field of research studying the implications, complexities and subsequent design of artificial social, spatial, cultural and haptic behaviours, protocols and interactions of robots with each other and with humans in equal measure. Intrinsically taking into account the structured and unstructured spaces of habitation, including industrial, commercial, healthcare, eldercare and domestic environments. This emergent perspective to robotic research encompasses and surpasses the conventions of Social robotics and Artificial society/social systems research. Which do not appear to acknowledge that numerous robots (humanoid and non-humanoid) and humans are increasingly inhabiting the same spaces which require similar performances and agency of social behaviour, particularly regarding the commercial emergence of workplace, personal and companion robotics.

Approach 

Robots in the near future will be required to behave socially and spatially intelligent in all contexts of artificial social interaction, recognising sophisticated cues from both humans and other robots alike, similar in some respects to the required social awareness and generally expected social behaviour of our animal companions. Furthermore, sociorobotics as a research platform also fully accepts that robots can be modular hardware, controlled by pre-programmed disembodied software agency (ubiquitous digital characters) or even 'Wizard of Oz' style teleoperation requiring the same social intelligence, awareness and protocols. Sociorobotics attempts to go further by observing and incorporating the aesthetic assemblages and intricacies of social, spatial, cultural & haptic complexities to study the creation of artificial social behaviours and the subsequent protocol design considerations for contemporary and future robotics. Sociorobotics also recognises the critical interdisciplinarity of contemporary and future robot design; acquiring theoretical foundations and research methodologies from HRI, Human Geography, Interaction Design, Actor-network theory and Social Psychology. These foundations bring together intimate concepts of space, haptics and social/cultural criteria of heterogeneous human-robot interactions (i.e. Real Dolls, Lars and the Real Girl), engendering a more comprehensive and cognizant research approach to successful robot design.

Theoretical Antecedents 

Professor Arvin Agah first coined the term 'sociorobotics' in 1993/4 to describe the study of robot team and colony behaviours but omitted to include himself and his colleagues as members and legitimate study subjects or actants of these sociorobotic assemblages. His and all roboticist's interactions with robot teams or colony members, including human controllers/creators/programmers and indeed, robot to robot, constitute this undefined term of study that optimally represents and describes this emergent field of research of the implications, complexities and design of spatial/social protocols and interactions of multiple robots, both with humans and each other.

"So who is pulling the strings? Well, the puppets do in addition to their puppeteers. It does not mean that puppets are controlling their handlers – this would be simply reversing the order of causality – and of course no dialectic will do the trick either. It simply means that the interesting question at this point is not to decide who is acting and how but to shift from a certainty about action to an uncertainty about action – but to decide what is acting and how.", (Bruno Latour, 2005, p. 60)

See also 

 Bruno Latour
 Social Robots
 Artificial society
 Human geography
 Cultural geography
 Social Psychology
 Interaction Design
 Human Robot Interaction
 Actor-network theory

References

External links 
 Toward the Human–Robot Co-Existence Society: On Safety Intelligence for Next Generation Robots
 Sociorobotics.com
 Sociorobotics BLOG

Robotics